The Richmond Hill Line is a surface transit line on Myrtle Avenue in Queens, New York City. Once a streetcar line owned by the Brooklyn–Manhattan Transit Corporation, it was replaced on April 26, 1950 by the B55 bus route. The trolley tracks were not removed until April 1955, when Myrtle Avenue was being repaved. The bus was renumbered on December 11, 1988 as the Q55 Myrtle Avenue (East) bus route (as opposed to the B54 route on the western portion of Myrtle Avenue), operated by the New York City Transit Authority.

Current route
The current Q55 route is identical to the route it used when it opened in 1950. The Q55 begins at the Ridgewood Intermodal Terminal at the Myrtle–Wyckoff Avenues Subway station on the Brooklyn-Queens border. It then runs via Myrtle Avenue, cutting through Forest Park, and continuing to Jamaica Avenue and Myrtle Avenue in Richmond Hill, where it meets up with the 121st Street subway station.

In December 2019, the MTA released a draft redesign of the Queens bus network. As part of the redesign, the Q55 would have been replaced by a "neighborhood" route called the QT55, which would have been extended to Jamaica using Jamaica Avenue. The redesign was delayed due to the COVID-19 pandemic in New York City in 2020, and the original draft plan was dropped due to negative feedback. A revised plan was released in March 2022. The planned changes to the Q55 are similar to those proposed in the 2019 plan.

References

External links

Richmond Hill Trolley Line on Myrtle Avenue (Richmond Hill Historical Society)
About NYC Transit; Historic NYC Trolley Photos (MTA.com)

Streetcar lines in Queens, New York
Q055
055